Riofreddo is a comune (municipality) in the Metropolitan City of Rome in the Italian region Lazio, located about  northeast of Rome. The name is derived from the Latin "Rivus frigidus," meaning "cold river" or "cold stream."

It was an ancient Roman fortress guarding the ancient Via Valeria of which a few sections remain with the typical Roman paving and a bridge attributed to the Emperor Nerva. It also preserves three necropolises, the most interesting and oldest dating to 1000 BC.

Riofreddo borders the following municipalities: Arsoli, Cineto Romano, Oricola, Roviano, Vallinfreda.

References

External links

  Museum of Cultures of Riofreddo

Cities and towns in Lazio